The 2011 Pacific Coast Soccer League season was the 16th season in the modern era of the league. The regular season began on 14 May and ended on 16 July, and was followed by the Challenge Cup, a post season tournament of the top four teams to determine the league's champion. Each team played between 12 and 13 matches depending on the division entered. The women's open division consisted of 11 teams while the men's open division had 7.

In the Men's Premier division, the Vancouver Thunderbirds finished the season in first place, but Okanagan Challenge won the playoff finals. In the Women's Premier division, the Vancouver Thunderbirds won both the season and the playoffs.

Men's Premier Division Teams

Men's Reserve Division Teams

Women's

Format
The teams will play a 13-game, unbalanced schedule.

Standings

References

External links 
Official League Site
A Young Person's Guide to the Pacific Coast Soccer League

2011

2011 domestic association football leagues
3
Pacific Coast Soccer